In mathematics, the Lagrangian Grassmannian is the smooth manifold of Lagrangian subspaces of a real symplectic vector space V. Its dimension is n(n + 1) (where the dimension of V is 2n). It may be identified with the homogeneous space

,

where  is the unitary group and  the orthogonal group. Following Vladimir Arnold it is denoted by Λ(n). The Lagrangian Grassmannian is a submanifold of the ordinary Grassmannian of V.

A  complex Lagrangian Grassmannian is the complex homogeneous manifold of Lagrangian subspaces of a complex  symplectic vector space V of dimension 2n. It may be identified with the homogeneous space of complex dimension n(n + 1)

,

where  is the compact symplectic group.

As a homogeneous space

Topology
The stable topology of the Lagrangian Grassmannian and complex Lagrangian Grassmannian is completely understood, as these spaces appear in the Bott periodicity theorem: , and  – they are thus exactly the homotopy groups of the stable orthogonal group, up to a shift in indexing (dimension).

Its first homology group is therefore also infinite cyclic, as is its first cohomology group, with a distinguished generator given by the square of the determinant of a unitary matrix, as a mapping to the unit circle. Arnold showed that this leads to a description of the Maslov index, introduced by V. P. Maslov.

For a Lagrangian submanifold M of V, in fact, there is a mapping

which classifies its tangent space at each point (cf. Gauss map). The Maslov index is the pullback via this mapping, in

of the distinguished generator of

.

Maslov index

A path of symplectomorphisms of a symplectic vector space may be assigned a Maslov index, named after V. P. Maslov; it will be an integer if the path is a loop, and a half-integer in general.

If this path arises from trivializing the symplectic vector bundle over a periodic orbit of a Hamiltonian vector field on a symplectic manifold or the Reeb vector field on a contact manifold, it is known as the Conley–Zehnder index. It computes the spectral flow of the Cauchy–Riemann-type operators that arise in Floer homology.

It appeared originally in the study of the WKB approximation and appears frequently in the study of quantization, quantum chaos trace formulas, and in symplectic geometry and topology.  It can be described as above in terms of a Maslov index for linear Lagrangian submanifolds.

References

V. I. Arnold,  Characteristic class entering in quantization conditions, Funktsional'nyi Analiz i Ego Prilozheniya, 1967, 1,1, 1-14, .
V. P. Maslov, Théorie des perturbations et méthodes asymptotiques. 1972
 Assorted source material relating to the Maslov index.

Symplectic geometry
Topology of homogeneous spaces
Mathematical quantization